The Butterberg is an elongated hill northeast of the spa town of Bad Harzburg in Goslar district, in the German state of Lower Saxony.

Part of the northern Harz foothills, the hill is located north of the Harz Nature Park at the rim of the Harz National Park. The Butterberg is part of the Harz - Brunswick Land - Eastphalia National Geopark; its steeply inclined strata belong to the Northern Harz Boundary Fault. In the west, the hill is bounded by the Radau river and the parallel Bundesstraße 4 highway. The mountain-ridge path offers scenic views to the Harz mountains and over the North German Plain.

The name Butter is associated with Low German buten (i.e. "outside", c.f. Buten and binnen). These are therefore hills lying outside or on the edge of given places. There are many other "Butterberg" hills in German-speaking regions.

See also
List of mountains and hills in Lower Saxony
List of mountains in the Harz

External links 
 Butterberg nature trail
 The Butterberg as part of the Harz / Braunschweiger Land / Ostfalen Geopark

Bad Harzburg

Hills of the Harz
Hills of Lower Saxony